The following is a partial list of German ambassadors to Romania.

Unified Germany (1870–1945) 
 1882–1885: Anton Saurma von der Jeltsch
 1888–1893: Bernhard von Bülow

East Germany (1949–1990) 
 1950–1951: Jonny Löhr (Head of mission)
 1952–1953: Georg Ulrich Handke
 1954–1957: Werner Eggerath
 1957–1958: Georg Stibi
 1958–1963: Wilhelm Bick
 1963–1964: Anton Ruh
 1965–1970: Ewald Moldt
 1970–1977: Hans Voß
 1977–1984: Siegfried Bock

West Germany (1949–1990)
 1971–1976: Erwin Wickert

Unified Germany (1990 to date) 
 2003–2006: Wilfried Gruber
 2006–2009: Roland Lohkamp
 2009–2013: Andreas von Mettenheim
 2013–present: Werner Hans Lauk

See also
 Germany–Romania relations

References

Romania
Germany